Pierre Franckh (born 1 May 1953 in Heilbronn, West Germany) is a German book author, motivational speaker, keynote speaker, entrepreneur, seminar leader, actor, and director.

Biography 
Pierre Franckh is the youngest son of the actress Ursula Franckh and the director, actor, and translator of French literature Hans Heinz Franckh. At the age of six, Franckh was already on stage with Theo Lingen. At the age of ten, he made his film debut in the feature film Das Haus in Montevideo (1963) by Helmut Käutner as one of Heinz Rühmann's children. In Pepe, der Paukerschreck (1969), he played a student spy infiltrated by his uncle and principal (Theo Lingen) at the Mommsen Gymnasium, but who eventually adapts. His breakthrough came at the age of 14 when he played a leading role in Der Kommissar. Since then, he has appeared in many feature films, frequently appeared on theater stages such as the Residenztheater in Munich, the Renaissance Theater in Berlin, and performed in Stuttgart and Frankfurt am Main.

On television, he appeared in over 350 television productions. In series such as Derrick or Der Alte, Diese Drombuschs, Rivalen der Rennbahn, etc., he took on character roles and comedic roles in numerous television plays.

From 1976 to 1978, he hosted Hit-Kwiss, the first pop music quiz program for young people, with hits and stars from international hit parades, which ran successfully for over three years on ARD, a novelty in German television history.

In 1995, he played the stenographer in the national and international award-winning film Der Totmacher, a film directed by Romuald Karmakar that mainly dealt between three people, alongside Götz George and Jürgen Hentsch. This film is the most awarded in German cinema history, including the German Film Award, and was submitted as an official entry for the Academy Awards in 1996. In 2002, Costa-Gavras' film The Deputy, in which Franckh played the role of Pastor Wehr, screened in competition at the Berlin International Film Festival.

He debuted as a screenwriter and director in 2000 with the feature film Just the Beginning. He is the author of the theater play Das ist mein Bett.

His great-granduncle founded Franckh'sche Verlagsbuchhandlung in 1822 Friedrich Schiller's sister, Luise Dorothea Katharina Schiller, married Johann Gottlieb Franckh, (b. 1766; † 1836), a dean by profession, a great-granduncle of Pierre Franckh. Pierre Franckh's grandfather, Manfred Franckh, was a friend and patron of Count Zeppelin, and published his first books. Franckh's grandfather, Manfred Franckh, was a friend and patron of Count Zeppelin.

Pierre Franckh has been married to Michaela Merten since 1992 and lives in Munich. In 1993, a daughter was born to them.

Writer and Coach 
Since 1996, Franckh has also been active as an author of advice books and coaches.

In September 2004, his advice book Glücksregeln für die Liebe was published by Koha-Verlag and made the bestseller list of Stern magazine. With a total circulation of over three million, Pierre Franckh is one of the most successful German authors in life advice. His books have been published in 21 countries. At times, three of his books were on the Focus bestseller lists at the same time. His series Der 6-Minuten-Coach became a SPIEGEL bestseller. Franckh lectures all over the world and gives seminars. As a coach, he is active in business and a trainer for kinesiologists and alternative practitioners.

In 2014, together with his wife Michaela Merten, he founded the online academy and community Happiness House, which offers online courses for personal development, happiness training, and meditation based on the findings of positive psychology.

Filmography 

1962: Peter Pan (TV)
1963: Südfrüchte (TV)
1963: The House in Montevideo
1964: 
1964: Unsere große Schwester
1966: Spielplatz (TV)
1966: Millionär in der Seifenblase
1968: Sie schreiben mit – Die Chauffeursmütze
1969: Der Kommissar: Auf dem Stundenplan Mord
1969: Pepe, der Paukerschreck (Pepe: His Teacher's Fright)
1969: Hurra, die Schule brennt! (Hurrah, the School Is Burning)
1970: Frisch, fromm, fröhlich, frei
1970: Der Kommissar: ...wie die Wölfe
1971: Rappelkiste
1971: Cabaret
1972: Fußballtrainer Wulf
1972: Der Kommissar - "Tod eines Schulmädchens" (TV)
1972: Der Kommissar - "Blinde Spiele" (TV)
1973: Der Kommissar - "Tod eines Buchhändlers" (TV)
1974: Unter Ausschluß der Öffentlichkeit
1974: Unser Walter (7 Episoden)
1975: Crime After School 
1975: Derrick - Season 2, Episode 7: "Hoffmanns Höllenfahrt" (TV)
1976: Derrick - Season 3, Episode 13: "Pecko" (TV)
1976: Block 7
1976: Bier und Spiele
1976–1978: HIT KWISS
1977: Tatort: Spätlese
1977: Polizeiinspektion 1: Die Reportage
1977: Eichholz und Söhne
1978: Polizeiinspektion 1: Glücksspiele
1978: Ausgerissen! Was nun?
1979: The Lady Vanishes
1979: Die Geschichte der Anna Wildermuth (TV)
1979: Der Alte: Der Abgrund
1979: Was wären wir ohne uns
1980: Grenzfälle
1980: Sunday Children
1980: Derrick - Season 7, Episode 2: "Unstillbarer Hunger" (TV)
1981: Derrick - Season 8, Episode 7: "Das sechste Streichholz" (TV)
1981: Wolly
1981: Merlin
1981: Der Alte: Freispruch
1981: Manni, der Libero
1982: Tatort: So ein Tag …
1982: Gefährliches Spiel
1982: Tatort: Tod auf dem Rastplatz
1982: Ein bisschen Halleluja (TV)
1983: Diese Drombuschs (TV series)
1983: Tatort: Der Schläfer
1983: Der Alte: Kahlschlag
1983: Polizeiinspektion 1, Episode "Die Fortuna-Verkehrs-GmbH"
1983: Der Eimer und die Mona Lisa
1983: Der Mann aus dem Gästezimmer
1983: Kontakt bitte
1983: Krimistunde
1983: Unsere schönsten Jahre
1983: Ravioli
1984: Vor dem Sturm
1984: Tatort: Verdeckte Ermittlung
1984: Derrick - Season 11, Episode 5: "Tödlicher Ausweg" (TV)
1985: Derrick - Season 12, Episode 2: "Gregs Trompete" (TV)
1985: Derrick - Season 12, Episode 11: "Tod eines jungen Mädchens" (TV)
1985: Unsere schönsten Jahre
1985: Taxi, Schraube, Schrott
1985: Vor dem Sturm
1985: Tatort: Acht, neun – aus
1986: Glückliche Reise
1986: Der Schatz im Niemandsland
1986: Mütter und Töchter (TV)
1986: Derrick - Season 13, Episode 11: "Die Rolle seines Lebens" (TV)
1986: The Black Forest Clinic (TV series)
1987: Der Schatz im Niemandsland (TV miniseries)
1987: Großstadtrevier: Fotos aus Ibiza
1988: Ein Heim für Tiere
1988: Der Schwammerlkönig
1988: Der Freispruch
1988: Derrick - Season 15, Episode 5: "Auf Motivsuche" (TV)
1988: Medicopter 117 – Jedes Leben zählt (TV)
1989: Bodo - Eine ganz normale Familie (The Wiz Kid)
1989: Geld macht nicht glücklich
1989: Forstinspektor Buchholz
1989: Rivalen der Rennbahn
1989: Tatort: Keine Tricks, Herr Bülow
1991: Tatort: Rikki
1992: Der Tanz auf dem Seil (TV)
1993: Sylter Geschichten (TV)
1993: Das Geheimnis der Uhr
1993: Eurocops: Alte Freunde
1993: Glückliche Reise – Puerto Rico
1994: Derrick - Season 21, Episode 9: "Der Schlüssel" (TV)
1994: Die Botschafterin (TV)
1994: Blinde Rache
1994: Weißblaue Geschichten
1994: Nachtrunden
1994: Tatort: Der Rastplatzmörder
1994: Immer wenn sie Krimis liest
1995: Tatort: Eine mörderische Rolle
1995: Der Tannenzweig
1995: Der Alte: Am hellichten Tag
1995: Kämpf um dein Leben
1995: Veterinarian Christine II: The Temptation
1995: Deathmaker
1995: Aus heiterem Himmel (TV series)
1996: Der Mann ohne Schatten (TV series)
1996: Derrick - Season 23, Episode 12: "Bleichröder ist tot" (TV)
1996: Der Mann ohne Schatten
1996: Der Tod schreibt das Ende
1996: Bleichroeder ist tot
1997: Weißblaue Wintergeschichten
1997: Café Meineid
1997: Derrick - Season 24, Episode 10: "Pornocchio" (TV)
1997: Rosenzweigs Freiheit (Rosenzweig's Freedom, TV)
1998: Derrick - Season 25, Episode 2: "Anna Lakowski" (TV)
1998: Derrick - Season 25, Episode 5: "Das Abschiedsgeschenk" (TV)
1998: Medicopter 117 – Jedes Leben zählt
1998: Frankfurt Millennium (TV)
1999: Il Cuore e la spada (The Heart and the Sword, TV)
2000: Just the Beginning, also Director
2000: Der Alte: Schrecklicher Irrtum
2001: Siska: Die Hölle des Staatsanwaltes
2001: Zwei Brüder: Abschied, TV
2001: Im Name des Gesetzes (TV)
2002: Amen.
2003: Edel & Starck (TV)
2003: SOKO München: Match over
2004: Unser Charly: Gewagter Einsatz, TV

Theater (selection) 

Residenztheater
 Undine
 Macbeth
 Faust
 Prinz Friedrich von Homburg

Komödie München
 Mein Vater hatte recht
 Schon vor der Hochzeit
 Die Schule der Ehe
 Belvedere

Theater am Kurfürstendamm
 Frühstück bei Riffifi

Renaissancetheater Berlin
 Der Kirschgarten

Tournee
 Der Strom
 Schmetterlinge sind frei
 Meine dicke Freundin

Heilbronn
 Das Standbild der Morgenröte
 Der Tod im Apfelbaum

Stuttgart
 Der Mann aus dem Gästezimmer
 Die Jungs von nebenan

Bonn
 Der Mann aus dem Gästezimmer

Hannover
 Clown Clown Clown
 Sommernachtstraum

Dubbing roles (selection)

Movies 
 1974: Ekkehardt Belle as Pauli in Es war nicht die Nachtigall
 1980: Christopher Atkins as Richard in Die blaue Lagune
 1990: Michael Biehn as Lt. James Curran in Navy Seals – Die härteste Elitetruppe der Welt
 1992: Tim Curry as Hector, Hotelconcierge in Kevin – Allein in New York
 1993: Michael Jeter as Pater Ignatius in Sister Act 2 – In göttlicher Mission
 2005: Bill Bailey as Wal in Per Anhalter durch die Galaxis

Series  
1981: as Verkehrspolizist in Die Märchenbraut
1983: Michael Bowen as Bill Reed in Falcon Crest
1987: Michael Bowen as Jack Harm in Ein Engel auf Erden
1993–1994: as Wusel in Als die Tiere den Wald verließen
1995: Harry Anderson as Harry "The Hat" Gittes in Cheers

Awards 
 1996: German Film Award 1996 with Der Totmacher in the category: Best Film

Publications

Books

Card set 
 2005: Erfolgreich Wünschen: 49 Karten und Anleitung.,  Königsfurt-Urania Verlag, ISBN 978-3038190233.
 2009: Heute ist ein guter Tag: 78 Impulse für ein erfülltes Leben,  Arkana, ISBN 978-3442338399. 
 2009: Das Geheimnis der Wunschkraft: Anleitungen zur Wunscherfüllung. Kartenset mit 49 Motiv- und 11 Anleitungskarten., Königsfurt-Urania Verlag.
 2009: Das Gesetz der Resonanz-Kartendeck, Koha, ISBN 978-3867281065. 
 2011: Wünsch dich schlank: 49 Schritte zum Wunschgewicht, Königsfurt-Urania Verlag, ISBN 9783868267389.
 2014: Erfolgreich Lieben – 49 Botschaften, AGM Urania.

Stand-up display/calendar 
 2007: Der Wunschkalender. KOHA-Verlag, ISBN 978-3867283311.
 2011–2012–2013: Wünsch dich schlank – Jahreskalender .
 2011: Entfalte deine Wunschkraft. GRÄFE UND UNZER Verlag, ISBN 978-3833822919. 
 2014: Erfinde dich neu in 6 Minuten täglich. Arkana, ISBN 978-3442341658.
 2015: Erfolgreich Wünschen, Königsfurt Urania.

References

External links
 
  

1953 births
Living people
German male television actors
German male film actors
German male stage actors
20th-century German male actors
21st-century German male actors
People from Heilbronn
German male writers